San Rafael is a census-designated place (CDP) in Cibola County, New Mexico, United States. As of the 2010 census it had a population of 933.

An 1850 U.S. Army map shows a Hay Camp near San Rafael.  Fort Wingate was established (moved from Seboyeta, New Mexico) by Lt. Colonel J. Francisco Chavez, 1st New Mexico Infantry under the orders of General Edward Canby in 1862. It was located near a large spring and designed to house four companies of troops. Colonel Kit Carson and four companies of New Mexico Volunteers used this fort. Carson was ordered by General Carleton to round up first the Mescalero Apache, then the Navajo and send them to Bosque Redondo. San Rafael was a stop on the Navajo's journey to and from Fort Sumner. In 1868 the garrison and name of the fort was transferred to the former site of Fort Lyon, near Gallup.

Demographics

See also
Silvester Mirabal

References

Census-designated places in New Mexico
Census-designated places in Cibola County, New Mexico